Olivia Newton-John: Hopelessly Devoted to You is an Australian miniseries based on the Australian singer/songwriter and actress Olivia Newton-John. The miniseries premiered on 13 May 2018 and concluded on 20 May 2018 on the Seven Network.

Production
In November 2016, Delta Goodrem was announced to play the main role of Olivia Newton-John. Even though Goodrem is contracted to Nine, they gave her permission to star in the series. In December 2016, the series commenced filming in Melbourne.

Cast
Delta Goodrem as Olivia Newton-John
Morgan Griffin as young Olivia 
Kate Jenkinson as Pat Carroll
Georgia Flood as young Pat
Robyn Malcolm as Irene Newton-John
Richard Bligh as Brinley Newton-John
Todd Lasance as Lee Kramer
Richard Brancatisano as Matt Lattanzi
George Xanthis as John Travolta
Paul David-Goddard as John Farrar
Ben Shumann as young John 
Diana Glenn as Nancy Chuda
Lucy Honigman as Helen Reddy
Gyton Grantley as Roger Davies
Hugo Johnstone-Burt as Bruce Welch
Anthony Brandon Wong as Patrick McDermott
Will Ewing as Ian Turpie
Jeremy Lindsay-Taylor as John Easterling
Grant Cartwright as Peter Allen
Alison Bell as Betsy Cox
Alicia Banit as Chloe Lattanzi
Lily Jones as young Chloe
Sam Duncan as Johnny O'Keefe
Samantha Morley as Yvonne McDermott
 Ashley Stocco

Criticism
According to Newton-John's daughter, Chloe Lattanzi, the series was created without Olivia's knowledge, participation or consent. Lattanzi told Women's Day "What's upsetting is the way it's been done. Not one part of it has come directly from our family, it is completely unauthorised. Nobody asked us to take part or consulted us about accuracy. [sic] and it's weird that some of the heaviest and saddest times of our lives have been turned into a fictional TV miniseries for the sole purpose of entertainment." Olivia later consented to the series providing the profits went to her cancer hospital.

Soundtrack

On 11 May 2018, Sony Music Australia released the soundtrack I Honestly Love You, which is credited to Delta Goodrem. It includes 13 tracks; two as duets with Olivia Newton-John.

Home media
A Region 4 DVD was released in Australia on 6 June 2018 by Roadshow Entertainment.

Distribution
The series debuted in the United States on Lifetime on 16 February 2019.

Reception

Viewership

References

External links
 

Seven Network original programming
Biographical films about musicians
Biographical films about actors
2010s Australian television miniseries
2018 Australian television series debuts
2018 Australian television series endings
Cultural depictions of Australian women
Cultural depictions of pop musicians
Cultural depictions of actors
Cultural depictions of John Travolta
Olivia Newton-John